We Were Seven Widows is a 1939 Italian "white-telephones" comedy film directed by Mario Mattoli and starring Antonio Gandusio.

Cast
 Antonio Gandusio - L'avvocato Ruggero Mauri
 Nino Taranto - Orlando, il cameriere di bordo
 Laura Nucci - Vera
 Silvana Jachino - Barbara
 Laura Solari - Anna Calcini
 Greta Gonda - Maria
 Anna Maria Dossena - Ada
 Maria Dominiani - Liliana
 Amelia Chellini - Gioconda Zappi Torriani
 Oscar Andriani - Il marito di Liliana
 Gino Bianchi - Francesco, il marito di Anna
 Adolfo Geri - Il marito di Ada
 Mario Siletti - Popi, il marito geloso di Vera
 Carlo Micheluzzi - Matteo
 Ori Monteverdi - L'infermiera
 Armando Migliari - Il medico

External links

1939 films
1939 comedy films
Italian comedy films
1930s Italian-language films
Italian black-and-white films
Films directed by Mario Mattoli
1930s Italian films